Gombroon ware is a form of white pottery resembling porcelain, pierced with holes or slits, and perhaps sparsely decorated with simple black or blue lines, which was created in the late 17th and early 18th century Gombroon (now Bandar Abbas), Iran. It was made from crushed quartz, white clay, and frit, which when fired becomes glassy. Early mentions of Gombroon ware occur in John Fryer's New Account of East-India and Persia (1672-1681), Martin Lister's Journey to Paris (1699), and Horace Walpole's description of his Strawberry Hill collection.

References 
 "Notes on the Manufacture of Porcelain at Chelsea", by Augustus W. Franks, in The Archaeological Journal, published Under the Direction of the Central Committee of the Archaeological Institute of Great Britain and Ireland, for the Encouragement and Prosecution of Researches Into the Arts and Monuments of the Early and Middle Ages, Volume 19, 1862, pages 342-343.
 A new account of East-India and Persia, in eight letters being nine years travels begun 1672 and finished 1681 : containing observations made of the moral, natural and artificial estate of those countries ..., John Fryer, Printed by R.R. for Ri. Chiswell ..., 1698.
 A Journey to Paris in the Year 1698, Dr. Martin Lister, Second Edition, London, 1699, page 138.
 A Description of the Villa of Horace Walpole, Youngest Son of Sir Robert Walpole Earl of Orford, at Strawberry-Hill, Near Twickenham: With an Inventory of the Furniture, Pictures, Curiosities, &c., Horace Walpole, Thomas Kirgate, 1774, page 19.
 Victoria & Albert Museum: Gombroon ware
 Ashmolean Museum: Gombroon ware
 Encyclopædia Britannica: Gombroon ware

Iranian pottery